Volo Volo de Boston (or simply Volo Volo) is a Haitian compas band based in Boston, Massachusetts.

History
The band was first formed in 1969 under the name Haiti Combo. It was later changed to Volo Volo de Boston in 1972 with Eric Breneus as the vocalist  approximately two years before the arrival of Ti Manno, Moise Desir, and Ricot Mazarin. In 1978, Chris Bazile and Fequiere Lucien joined the group as singers.

The group became an international success instantly after the release of their first album entitled Caressé, which earned them the title "Lover's Band" during the 70–90s while touring through Haiti, France and the French West Indies (Martinique, Guadeloupe and French Guiana), Panama, Canada and across the United States where they were well received. Volo Volo de Boston received many awards

Band members 
 current members
Fequiere Lucien (ht) – lead vocalist, songwriter (1978–present)
Hans Felix – former guitarist, composer, bandleader (1972), current member
Fritz Felix – Co-Founder of the Group, former percussionist, former manager, current advisor

 former members
Eddy Charles – 2nd guitar
Jersaint Charles – bass 
Eddy Catan – congas
Laud Jn Jacques – keyboard
Carlo Sauvignon – congas
Rico Mazarin – lead vocals
Patrick Casseus – drums 
Roland Raymond – bass
Paul Fleury – congas
Henry Hans – bass
Lesly Jean – drums
Serge Jerome – saxophone
David Rizza – percussion
Wilson Pierre – congas, chant, songwriter
Yves Leslie Orne – choral
Joel Springer – saxophone, synthesizer
Tom Hall – saxophone
Gary Shore – saxophone
Joseph Laine – backing vocals
Frantz Rolls – guitar
Frank London – trumpet, arranger (1978–84)
Ti Manno – lead vocals, songwriter (deceased)
Serge Fleury – drums (deceased)
Eric Breneus – lead vocals (1971) (deceased)
Chris Bazile – lead vocalist (1978–91)
Guy Gondre – guitar, bandleader (2) (deceased)
Emmanuel Edouard Salvant – guitar (1978–81)
Pressoir Desruisseaux – tam-tam (1978–81)
Jean Leon Mascary – lead vocalist (1983–2015)
Roland Casseus – drums (1980)
Moise Desir – alto saxophone, Caressé (deceased)
Pierre Emmanuel Charles – alto saxophone, La Nature

Discography 
 Caressé (1975)
 La Nature (1979)
 Nou Nan Route (1980)
 14 Karat Gold (1981)
 Vive Compas (1982)
 Volo Volo (1984)
 Mèt Cafou (1985)
 Volo Volo (1987)
 Volo's The Best (1990)

<small>Source:

References

External links

 Volo Volo de Boston musique.haiti.free.fr
 Volo Volo de Boston Konpa.info
 Volo Volo de Boston archive.org/details/vinyl_bostonpubliclibrary

Haitian-American culture in Massachusetts
Haitian musical groups